Divyadaan: Journal of Philosophy and Education (ISSN 0972-2211) is published three times a year by Divyadaan: Salesian Institute of Philosophy, Nashik, India. It focuses mainly on philosophy, with interest also in the streams of education and communication, which are the two specializations offered by the Institute. The Institute is run by the Society of St Francis de Sales, also known as the Salesians of Don Bosco, an international Catholic religious congregation whose primary mission is the education of young people, especially those who are disadvantaged. The congregation also interests itself in the welfare of middle- and working-class people, hence its interest in popular communication.

Earlier names
Originally entitled Divyadaan: A Philosophical Annual, in 1995 it was renamed Divyadaan: Journal of Philosophy, and in 1996 Divyadaan: Journal of Philosophy and Education. Articles are indexed in The Philosopher's Index.

Features
Besides articles, the journal offers 'Dissertation Abstracts' (of doctoral dissertations in philosophy, education and communication published in the South Asia region) and 'Reviews and Notices'.

In 2009 (vol. 20/2) the journal began serializing Richard De Smet's 'Guidelines in Indian Philosophy', which up to then had existed only in the form of cyclostyled notes for students at Jnana Deepa Vidyapeeth, Pune.

Issues
Vol. 1 (1984–85)
Vol. 2 (1985–86)
Vol. 3 (1987–88)
Vol. 4 (1988–89)
Vol. 5 (1993–94)
Vol. 6/1, 6/2 (1995) [From 1995, 2 issues per year]
Vol. 7/1, 7/2 (1996)
Vol. 8/1, 8/2, 8/3 (1997) [From 1997, 3 issues per year]
Vol. 9 (1998)
Vol. 10 (1999)
Vol. 11 (2000)
Vol. 12 (2001)
Vol. 13 (2001)
Vol. 14 (2003)
Vol. 15 (2004)
Vol. 16 (2005)
Vol. 17 (2006)
Vol. 18 (2007)
Vol. 19 (2008)
Vol. 20 (2009)
Vol. 21 (2010)
Vol. 22 (2011)
Vol. 23 (2012)
Vol. 24 (2013)
Vol. 25 (2014)
Vol. 26 (2015)
Vol. 27 (2016)

Editors
Joaquim D'Souza edited the journal from 1984-85 to 1987-88 (vols. 1-3); Albano Fernandes from 1993 to 1998 (vols. 5-9); Ivo Coelho in 1988-89 (vol. 4), and then again since 1999 (vol. 10). Since 2014 (vol. 25) Banzelao Julio Teixeira has joined as co-editor.

Special issues
15/1 (2004) and 15/2 (2004) contain a selected and annotated Emmanuel Levinas bibliography compiled by Sidney J. Mascarenhas. 
15/3 (2004) is a Lonergan Centenary Issue (1904–2004), containing papers by Ivo Coelho, Robert Doran, Frederick Lawrence, Philip McShane, Robert Pen and Phyllis Wallbank. 
16/3 (2005) is a Divyadaan: Salesian Institute of Philosophy Silver Jubilee Issue (1980–2005), containing articles by Patrick Byrne, Mauro Mantovani, Robert Pen, Peter Gonsalves, and Savio Silveira. 
17/1 (2006) contains the papers of the Silver Jubilee conference "Philosophy of Education: A Salesian Perspective." It contains papers by Robert Pen, Joaquim D'Souza, Ivo Coelho, Godfrey D'Sa, and Ashley Miranda. 
19/1-2 (2008) published the papers of the conference Hermeneutics, Postmodernism, Relativism, in honour of Frederick G. Lawrence. It includes four papers by Lawrence, and one each by Ashley Miranda, Johnson Puthenpurackal, John Sequeira, Keith D'Souza, Stanislaus Swamikannu, George Kuruvilla, and Ivo Coelho. It also contains a Review of Lawrence's writings by Bernard Lonergan, and a Lawrence Bibliography. 
20/3 (2009) is the twentieth anniversary issue, and also contains the 10 year index, 11 (2000) - 20 (2009).
21/2 (2010) contains a series of articles under the title, "Do you want a sane global economy?", an attempt to kickstart 'functional specialization' in this field, under guest editorship of Philip McShane.
23/2 (2012) is a special issue entitled "Salesian Education: Preventive or Expressive?" with papers by Peter Gonsalves, Kenneth Pereira, Eunan McDonnell, Tadeusz Lewicki, Mario Comoglio, and C. Antonyraj.
25/2 (2014) is a silver jubilee issue: "Divyadaan: Journal of Philosophy and Education: Silver Jubilee Issue: The Christian Vision: Philosophical Perspectives." 
26/1-2 (2015) is a dedicated issue: "Fourth International Lonergan Workshop, Jerusalem 2013," and contains most of the papers of the Jerusalem Workshop: Robert Pen, Carla Mae Streeter, Patrick Byrne, Maury Schepers, Tom McAuley, Stephanie Saldana, Thomas J. McPartland, Cloe Taddei-Ferretti, Ivo Coelho, Saturnino Muratore, and Frederick G. Lawrence.
26/3 (2015) is a dedicated issue: "On the Occasion of the Bicentennial: Don Bosco's Pedagogical and Spiritual Legacy," containing articles by Pascual Chavez, former Rector Major of the Salesians of Don Bosco, Ajoy Fernandes, Sahayadas Fernando, Roberto Spataro, John Roche, Joshtrom Kureethadam, Joaquim D'Souza, and Samir A. Emad. 
27/1 (2016) will be dedicated to a series of articles on Pope Francis' Laudato si'.

References

Literary magazines published in India
Philosophy magazines
Salesians of Don Bosco
Triannual magazines
Magazines established in 1984
1984 establishments in Maharashtra
Nashik
Mass media in Maharashtra